Skalochori is a village and a community of the Voio municipality. Before the 2011 local government reform it was part of the municipality of Neapoli, of which it was a municipal district. The 2011 census recorded 102 inhabitants in the village.

References

Populated places in Kozani (regional unit)